Tongeren railway station is a railway station on the Hasselt-Liège railway in the city of Tongeren. The station also marks the beginning of the Tongeren-Aachen railway through Visé to Germany. The station was also the final stop of the now demolished Drieslinter-Tongeren railway.

Signal box 
Tongeren signal box used to be located in the station building. It was permanently staffed until the 1990s, since when the train traffic in and around Tongeren has been regulated from Bilzen. The Tongeren signal box remained in place, but was only in use in the event of faults or maintenance works. On June 24, 2016, it was finally closed at the same time as the Bilzen signal box. Since then, train traffic has been regulated from Hasselt's modern, central traffic control post

The ticket office of the station is only open during the week, between 5:45 AM and 1 PM.

Services

Week

Weekend

References 

Railway stations in Belgium
Railway stations in Limburg (Belgium)
Buildings and structures in Tongeren
Railway stations opened in 1863